Al-Wataniya Private University, founded in 2007, is a private university located in Hama, Syria.

Structure

Faculties  

 Dentistry:
 Department of Biology
 Department of Odontology
 Department of dental therapy
 Department of Orthodontics and Pediatric Dentistry
 Department of Periodontology
 Department Prosthodontics
 Department of Oral and Maxillofacial Surgery
 Pharmacy:
 Department of Pharmaceutics and Pharmaceutical Technology
 Department of Pharmacology and Toxicology
 Department of Analytical and Food Chemistry
 Department of Biochemistry and Microbiology
 Department of Pharmaceutical Chemistry and Drug Control
 Department of Drugs
 Architecture:
 Department of Architecture
 Department of Urban planning
 Department of Interior Architecture
 Engineering:
 Department of Computer Engineering
 Department of Telecommunications Engineering
 Department of Civil Engineering
 Finance and administrative science:
 Department of Business Management
 Department of Accounting
 Department of Marketing
 Department of Finance & Banking

See also
List of universities in Syria

References

Wataniya University
Wataniya University
2007 establishments in Syria